The 2019 season is Hougang United's 22nd consecutive season in the top flight of Singapore football and in the S.League. Along with the S.League, the club will also compete in the Singapore Cup.

Squad

S.League Squad

U19 Squad

Coaching staff

Transfers

Pre-season transfers

ln 

Note 1: Fazrul Nawaz returned to the team after the loan and subsequently complete the transfer.

Note 2: Ariyan Shamsuddin returned to the team after being loaned to Garena Young Lions in 2018.  However, he was released for the season.

Note 3: Rafael Ramazotti was initially signed but left the club without paying off compensation to sign for Mexican club.

Out

Retained

Extension

Promoted 

Note 1: Idraki Adnan was signed to the 2019 season but subsequently released.

Trial

Mid-season transfer

In

Friendlies

Pre-Season Friendly

Tour of Cambodia - 12 to 16 February

Mid-Season Friendly

Team statistics

Appearances and goals

Note 1: Zulfahmi Arifin scored an own goal against Tampines Rovers on 3/3/2019.

Competitions

Overview

Singapore Premier League

Singapore Cup

See also 
 2016 Hougang United FC season
 2017 Hougang United FC season
 2018 Hougang United FC season

References 

Hougang United FC
Hougang United FC seasons